Tadpatri Assembly constituency is a constituency of the Andhra Pradesh Legislative Assembly, India. It is one of 14 constituencies in the Anantapur district. ‘Kethireddy Pedda Reddy is the present MLA of the constituency, who won the 2019 Andhra Pradesh Legislative Assembly election from YSR Congress Party’. 

Kethireddy Pedda Reddy of YSR Congress Party is currently representing the constituency.

Overview
It is part of the Anantapur Lok Sabha constituency along with another six Vidhan Sabha segments, namely, Rayadurg, Guntakal, Uravakonda, Singanamala, Anantpur Urban and Kalyandurg in the Anantapur district.

Mandals

Members of Legislative Assembly

Election results

Assembly elections 1952

Assembly Elections 2004

Assembly Elections 2009

Assembly elections 2014

Assembly elections 2019

See also
 List of constituencies of Andhra Pradesh Legislative Assembly

References

Assembly constituencies of Andhra Pradesh